Husmann is a surname. Notable people with the surname include:

Ed Husmann (1931–2018), American football player
Heinrich Husmann, German professor
Max Husmann, Swiss educator
Ralf Husmann (born 1964), German television producer, screenwriter, and writer
Ron Husmann (born 1937), American actor

See also
Hussman